Crown Point Press is a long-established printmaking workshop, primarily creating  and publishing etched, intaglio prints. Located in San Francisco since 1986, Crown Point Press was first established in 1962 in Richmond California by Kathan Brown. Crown Point Press works with artists by invitation-only and has published prints by over 100 artists including Anne Appleby, John Baldessari, Robert Bechtle, Chuck Close, John Cage, Elaine de Kooning, Richard Diebenkorn, Alex Katz, Ed Ruscha,  and Pat Stier.

They are identified as the publisher of a fictional collection of letters featured in the Spike Jonze 2013 film, Her.

References

External links 

 Crown Point Press website

Organizations based in San Francisco
Education in San Francisco
1962 establishments in California
Art in the San Francisco Bay Area
Printmaking groups and organizations
Small press publishing companies